Danny Holla (born 31 December 1987) is a Dutch professional footballer who plays as a midfielder for Sliema Wanderers in the Maltese Premier League.

Club career

Early career
Born in Almere, Flevoland, Holla started his career at FC Groningen. He played on loan to FC Zwolle during the first half of the 2007–08 season, but returned to parent club Groningen to replace Rasmus Lindgren, who had moved to Ajax. During the second half of the 2011–12 season, he was sent on loan again, this time to VVV-Venlo.

Brighton & Hove Albion
In June 2012, Holla signed with ADO Den Haag before transferring to English club Brighton & Hove Albion during August 2014. He scored his first goal for the club in a 3–2 loss against Brentford. His contract with Brighton & Hove Albion was terminated by mutual consent on 25 August 2016.

Melbourne Victory
In July 2018, Holla joined Australian club Melbourne Victory on a free transfer, signing a one-year contract, hoping to stay for longer. However, it was reported that the deal had fallen through and that the Dutchman admitted to abandoning contract negotiations.

Den Bosch
In late August 2018, after spells with Twente and PEC Zwolle, he joined Den Bosch. He was released by Den Bosch on 1 July 2019.

Sliema Wanderers
Holla joined Maltese club Sliema Wanderers in September 2020. He extended his contract with the Wanderers for the 2021–22 season on 18 August 2021.

References

External links
 

Living people
1987 births
Footballers from Almere
Association football midfielders
Dutch footballers
FC Groningen players
PEC Zwolle players
VVV-Venlo players
ADO Den Haag players
Brighton & Hove Albion F.C. players
FC Twente players
FC Den Bosch players
Sliema Wanderers F.C. players
Eredivisie players
Eerste Divisie players
English Football League players
Maltese Premier League players
Dutch expatriate footballers
Expatriate footballers in England
Dutch expatriate sportspeople in England
Expatriate footballers in Malta
Dutch expatriate sportspeople in Malta